The chief justice of the Hong Kong Court of Final Appeal, sometimes informally known as the chief justice of Hong Kong, is the head of the Judiciary of Hong Kong and the chief judge of the Court of Final Appeal. The chief justice is one of three permanent members of the Court. During British rule between 1843 and 1997, the head of the Hong Kong Judiciary was the chief justice of the Supreme Court of Hong Kong; that position became the chief judge of the High Court in 1997.

The first chief justice of the Hong Kong Court of Final Appeal was Andrew Li, who served for over 13 years.

Role of the chief justice 
The chief justice is the president of the Court of Final Appeal, and is charged with the administration of the Judiciary and often acts as its spokesperson. He is assisted by the court leaders of the lower courts for judicial administration (such as dealing with staffing, promotions, or public complaints), namely the chief judge of the High Court, chief district judge, and the chief magistrate. In hearing and determining an appeal, the Court will consist of five judges, with the chief justice sitting at the middle of the bench. However, the chief justice enjoys no higher authority than other Permanent or Non-permanent Judges of the court when it comes to judicial decisions. 

The office of Chief Justice is second only to the chief executive of Hong Kong in the Hong Kong order of precedence. In the case of an impeachment of a chief executive of Hong Kong, the chief justice presides over the trial as provided by the Hong Kong Basic Law. The chief justice is also the chairman ex-officio of the Judicial Officers Recommendation Commission which makes recommendations to fill a variety of judicial roles, and also determines the elevation of junior barristers to senior counsel status.

List 

All Chief Justice's, to date, have served for at least 10 years before retiring. Below is a list of all Chief Justice's sorted by length of tenure:

Residence

The chief justice resides at the Chief Justice's House, also known as the Clavadel, at 19 Gough Hill Road, The Peak. It was built in 1893. The chief justice is also chauffeured in a government vehicle with the license plate "CJ".

Judiciary administrator 
Attached to the office of the chief justice is a Judiciary administrator, who assists the chief justice in the overall administration of the Judiciary. Being the head of the Judiciary Administration, she has to ensure that proper support is provided to judges and judicial officers in the administration of justice, and that court operation is being carried out effectively and smoothly.

See also 
 Court of Final Appeal
Permanent Judges of the Court of Final Appeal
 Chief Judge of the High Court of Hong Kong
 Chief Justice of the Supreme Court of Hong Kong
 Legal system of Hong Kong

Notes

References